NGC 491 is a barred spiral galaxy located about 161 million light-years away from Earth, in the constellation Sculptor. NGC 491 was discovered by  astronomer John Herschel on September 25, 1834.

See also  
 NGC 7001
 List of NGC objects (1–1000)

References

External links 

Barred spiral galaxies
Sculptor (constellation)
0491
004914
Astronomical objects discovered in 1834